Auron is the name of two fictional DC Comics superheroes.

Auron (Omega Men)
The first Auron originally appeared in Green Lantern (vol. 2) #142 (July 1981), though he first appeared in his original form, Lambien, in a flashback sequence in Green Lantern (vol. 2) #141 (June 1981). Lambien, along with his twin brother the first Citadelian, was born as a result of a Psion attempt to crossbreed the Okaaran X'Hal with a Branx warrior. A subsequent experiment gave X'Hal godlike powers which she used to escape and return to Okaara with her two sons.

As an adult, Lambien was among the leaders of the Vegan system, known as the Omega Men, who resisted the aggression of the Citadel. Lambien sacrifices himself to enable to rest of the Omega Men to flee to safety. His body was placed in stasis where it was later reborn during a conflict on earth between the Omega Men and the Gordanians.

The reborn Lambien now referred to himself as Auron and joins the Omega Men in their battles against the Citadel, but finds himself manipulated by his mother X'Hal, who forces him to kill and destroy at her command. Auron leaves the Omega Men after they are forced to fight each other and cause the dispersal of X'Hal's essence.

Powers and abilities
Auron has nearly god-like energy manipulation powers. He can fly fast and can survive unprotected in the vacuum of space.

Auron (Jim Harper clone)
A second Auron first appears in Legacy of Superman #1 (1993). After Superman's death, scientist Paul Westfield steals Superman's body for experimentation. After discovering he also needs a disc containing Superman's genetic information, he creates a clone of Jim Harper (the Guardian) which he dubs Auron. Auron, who comes equipped with enhanced solar powered indestructible alloy armor and a jetpack, is ordered to retrieve the disc from other Cadmus members such as the Newsboy Legion, Dubbilex and the Guardian. The Newsboy Legion manage to convince Auron not to give Westfield the disc, and he subsequently leaves Earth.

In The Adventures of Superman #509 (February 1994), Auron meets Superman in space near a Virago Cruiser to team up against Massacre. At first believing Superman is an imposter, the two fight until Superman convinces Auron he is the genuine article. During their fight with Massacre Auron is hit by Massacre's energy blast and killed. Superman buries Auron on an isolated planet.

Auron's backpack, however, ends up damaged and in the hands of a scrap metal merchant. It is sold for booze.

Powers and abilities
Auron has a jetpack containing a binary computer that is cyber-linked into his mind. He does not need to breathe, eat, or sleep.

References
Auron I at the Unofficial Guide to the DC Universe
Auron II at the Unofficial Guide to the DC Universe
Comics characters introduced in 1993
DC Comics superheroes
de:Nebenfiguren im Superman-Universum#Auron